Tadeusz Zdzisław Nowak (born 28 November 1948 in Poland) is a Polish retired footballer.

Career
Nicknamed "Ferrari", in 1979, Nowak signed for Bolton Wanderers in the English top flight, with the club paying Legia Warsaw 50,000 pounds and 3 tractors. In the process, he became the first foreign player to play for Bolton Wanderers.

References

External links
 Tadeusz Nowak at National Football Teams

Polish footballers
1948 births
Living people
Association football forwards
Association football midfielders
Association football wingers
Poland international footballers
Zagłębie Wałbrzych players
Legia Warsaw players
Bolton Wanderers F.C. players
People from Karkonosze County